The women's 400 metres event at the 2013 Summer Universiade was held on 7–9 July.

Medalists

Results

Heats
Qualification: First 3 in each heat and 4 best performers advance to the Semifinals.

Semifinals
Qualification: First 3 in each heat and 2 best performers advance to the Finals.

Final

References 

400
2013 in women's athletics
2013